Vishnuvardhana was a king of the Varika tribe - modern day Virk Jats in Malwa, and probably a feudatory of Gupta Emperor Samudragupta. He is known from an inscription on a sacrificial pillar, the Bijayagadh inscription. The inscription is dated 428 of an uncertain era, which, based on epigraphical evidence, is thought to be Vikram Samvat, corresponding to be 371-372 CE.

The Bijayagadh Stone Pillar Inscription of Vishnuvardhana, locally known as Bhīm kī Lāţ, was erected at Bayana in Bharatpur district for having perfection been attained in samvat 428 on the fifteenth lunar day of the dark fortnight of (the month) Phâlguna. The Bijayagadh Stone Pillar Inscription of Vishnuvardhana reads as:

References

Gupta and post-Gupta inscriptions
Sanskrit inscriptions in India